Paremhat 12 - Coptic Calendar - Paremhat 14

The thirteenth day of the Coptic month of Paremhat, the seventh month of the Coptic year. In common years, this day corresponds to March 9, of the Julian Calendar, and March 22, of the Gregorian Calendar. This day falls in the Coptic Season of Shemu, the season of the Harvest.

Commemorations

Martyrs 

 The martyrdom of the Forty Martyrs of Sebaste

Saints 

 The departure of Pope Dionysius, the 14th Patriarch of the See of Saint Mark

Other commemorations 

 The return of Saint Macarius the Great, and Saint Macarius of Alexandria from exile

References 

Days of the Coptic calendar